The 2018–19 George Mason Patriots Men's basketball team represented George Mason University during the 2018–19 NCAA Division I men's basketball season. The season marked the 53rd for the program, the fourth under head coach Dave Paulsen, and the sixth as members of the Atlantic 10 Conference. The Patriots played their home games at EagleBank Arena in Fairfax, Virginia. They finished the season 18-15, 11-7 in A-10 Play to finish in 5th place. They defeated George Washington in the second round of the A-10 tournament before losing in the quarterfinals to St. Bonaventure.

Previous season
They finished last season 16–17, 9–9 in A-10 play to finish in a four-way tie for fifth place. As the No. 5 seed in the A-10 tournament, they defeated Massachusetts in the second round before losing to Saint Joseph's in the quarterfinals.

Offseason

2018 recruiting class

Source

Preseason
From July 31 to August 8, the men's basketball team toured Spain, visiting Madrid, Valencia and Barcelona among other cities. As part of the trip, the team played three games against Spanish semi-professional teams. The Patriots won games against Club Baloncesto Alcobendas and the Mataro All-Stars and lost to Baloncesto CP La Roda.

Honors and awards

Atlantic 10 Player of the Week
 Otis Livingston II - Dec. 3
 Justin Kier - Jan. 14
 Justin Kier - Jan. 21

Atlantic 10 All-Conference 2nd Team
 Justin Kier

Atlantic 10 Most Improved Player
 Justin Kier

Roster

Player statistics

Schedule and results

|-
!colspan=12 style=| Exhibition

|-
!colspan=12 style=| Non-conference regular season

|-
!colspan=12 style=|<span style=>A-10 regular season

|-
!colspan=12 style=|A-10 tournament

See also
2018–19 George Mason Patriots women's basketball team

References

George Mason Patriots men's basketball seasons
George Mason
George Mason men's basketball